Hammersmith was a Canadian rock band from Calgary, Alberta, that existed from 1975 to 1977, recording two albums which were released nationally by Mercury Records during that period.

History

The early line-up of the band comprised Doran Beattie (vocals), Dan Lowe (guitar), Jeff Boyne (guitar), Royden Morice (bass guitar), and James Llewellyn (drums); Beattie, Lowe, Morice had previously played in Painter.

The band signed to Mercury Records, which released their eponymous debut album in 1975.  Canadian distribution was through Polydor. Boyne and Llewellyn subsequently left and were replaced by Craig Blair and Dale Buchner. A second album, It's For You, was released in 1976, but lack of commercial success led to the band being dropped from the label in 1977 and splitting up later that year.

Lowe and Morice went on to join 451°. Beattie established himself as a solo artist in the 1990s, concentrating on country music.

Discography

Albums
Hammersmith (1975), Mercury
It's For You (1976), Mercury

Singles
"Late Night Lovin' Man" (1975), Mercury
"Funky As She Goes" (1975), Mercury
"Dancin' Fools" (1976), Mercury

References

Canadian hard rock musical groups
Musical groups from Calgary
Musical groups established in 1975
Musical groups disestablished in 1977
1975 establishments in Alberta
1977 disestablishments in Canada